Iltebanovo (İltaban) is a rural locality (a selo) in Kunakbayevsky Selsoviet, Uchalinsky District, Bashkortostan, Russia. The population was 480 as of 2010. There are 18 streets.

Geography 
Iltebanovo is located 10 km northwest of Uchaly (the district's administrative centre) by road. Kunakbayevo is the nearest rural locality.

References 

Rural localities in Uchalinsky District